Chiang Dao may refer to:
 Chiang Dao District
 Chiang Dao Subdistrict
Doi Chiang Dao, a mountain in Northern Thailand
Chiang Dao National Park
 Chiang Dao Wildlife Sanctuary